The Republic of Rose Island was a short-lived micronation on a man-made platform in the Adriatic Sea,  off the coast of the province of Rimini, Italy.

It was built by the Italian engineer Giorgio Rosa, who made himself its president and declared it an independent state on 1 May 1968. Rose Island had its own government, currency, post office, and commercial establishments, and the official language was Esperanto. However, it was never formally recognized as a sovereign state by any country of the world. Viewed by the Italian government as a ploy by Rosa to raise money from tourists while avoiding national taxation, Rose Island was occupied by the Italian police forces on 26 June 1968, subject to naval blockade, and eventually demolished in February 1969.

Since the first decade of the 2000s, Rose Island's history has been the subject of documentary research and rediscoveries based on the utopian aspect of its genesis.

Name

It is believed that the Esperanto term  (in ) was borrowed from the surname of Giorgio Rosa, the designer and builder of the artificial platform, as well as the creator and inspirer of the state entity, as well as from his desire to "see roses bloom on the sea".

History
In 1967, the Italian engineer Giorgio Rosa funded the construction of a  platform supported by nine pylons, and furnished it with a number of commercial establishments, including a restaurant, bar, nightclub, souvenir shop, and post office.

The platform declared independence on 1 May 1968, under the Esperanto name Insulo de la Rozoj, with Rosa as self-declared president. Both Esperanto rozo (plural rozoj) and Italian rosa (plural rose) mean "rose".
Soon afterwards, Rose Island issued a number of stamps, including one showing the approximate location of Rose Island in the Adriatic Sea. The purported currency of the republic was the mill, and this appeared on early stamp issues, although no coins or banknotes are known to have been produced. It had equivalent value to the Italian lira. The denomination's name was translated into Esperanto as milo (plural miloj) on later stamp issues (it was unrelated to the Esperantist currency spesmilo).

Rosa's actions were viewed by the Italian government as a ploy to raise money from tourists while avoiding national taxation. Whether or not this was the real reason behind Rosa's micronation, the Italian government's response was swift: a group of four carabinieri and Guardia di Finanza officers landed on the island and assumed control.

On 13 February 1969, the Italian Navy used explosives to destroy the facility, an act later portrayed on postage stamps issued by Rosa's self-declared government in exile.
Only one death was counted but never confirmed: apparently, Rosa's dog was on the platform during the facility's detonation.

Rosa died in 2017, having given his blessing for a film to be made about Rose Island. This was released in 2020.

In popular culture
 Rose Island is featured in the Italian comic book Martin Mystère, n. 193.
 Rose Island, a 2020 film based on the story of the micronation, directed by Sydney Sibilia, was released on Netflix on 8 December 2020.

See also
 REM Island, a platform towed into international waters for the purposes of offshore radio broadcasting.
 Republic of Minerva, a short-lived artificial island micronation in the Pacific Ocean.
 Sealand, a declared principality near the United Kingdom, built on a World War II sea fort.

References

Further reading

External links
 Italian-language website - discusses the history of Rose Island and its postage stamps. Includes a scan of part of a contemporary newspaper article.
 (including pictures of its destruction) and comments from the daughter of one of the people responsible for the destruction (Italian language)

Micronations in Italy
Artificial islands of Italy
Esperanto
Seasteading
States and territories established in 1968
States and territories disestablished in 1969
Former unrecognized countries
Micronations
Former republics